Keepin' My Eyes On You is the second album by Christian singer-songwriter Twila Paris, released in 1982 by Milk & Honey Records. Paris' first two radio singles "Humility" and the title song were both placed in the Top 20 on the Christian radio charts and her song "We Will Gloify" has become a praise and worship standard. Starting with this album produced by Jonathan David Brown, Paris' future albums would be produced by Brown up until 1989.

Track listings 
All songs written by Twila Paris.
"We Will Glorify" - 2:29
"Humility" - 4:33
"Keepin' My Eyes On You" - 3:58
"Make Me New" - 4:06
"I Belong to You" - 2:49
"Thank You for Keepin' Your Hand on Me" - 2:37
"It's So Easy" - 3:55
"I Commit My Love to You" - 4:14
"If the Feelings Ever Go Away" - 3:54
"Lookin' Up" - 2:55

Personnel 
 Twila Paris – lead vocals, backing vocals (5, 10)
 George "Smitty" Price – keyboards, arrangements
 Hadley Hockensmith – guitars
 Marty Walsh – guitars 
 John Patitucci – bass 
 Keith Edwards – drums 
 Alex MacDougall – percussion 
 Karl Denson – saxophones
 Ron Stout – trumpet 
 John Phillips – woodwinds, solos 
 Dan Collins – backing vocals (1-4, 6-9)
 Jamie Owens-Collins – backing vocals (1, 3)
 Bruce Hibbard – backing vocals (5, 10)

Production
 Phil Brower – executive producer 
 Jonathan David Brown – producer, arrangements, engineer 
 Wally Grant – assistant engineer 
 David Schober – assistant engineer 
 Michael Harris Design – art direction, design 
 Michael Borum – photography

Radio singles

References 

1982 albums
Twila Paris albums